Parliamentary elections were held in Slovakia on 12 June 1960, alongside national elections. All 87 seats in the National Council were won by the National Front.

Results

References

1960 elections in Czechoslovakia
Parliamentary elections in Slovakia
Legislative elections in Czechoslovakia
Czechoslovakia
One-party elections
June 1960 events in Europe
Election and referendum articles with incomplete results